James "Jimmy" Andrew Elmer (born 8 May 1971 in Melbourne, Victoria) is a former field hockey striker from Australia, who was a member of the team that won the bronze medal at the 2000 Summer Olympics in Sydney

He was nicknamed Jimmy by his teammates. Elmer made his senior debut for The Kookaburras in 1993. He played in every Champions Trophy since 1991, but always missed "the big ones", until the Sydney Games. There he finished his career after 102 international matches, in which he scored 30 goals.
 
James is currently captain for Doncaster in the Victorian Masters League A grade division. His team suffered a 5–4 loss to the Hawthorn Hockey Club in the 2012 grand final following extra time in a penalty goal shoot-out. James took the 4th of 5 penalties for his team, which was saved by the Hawthorn keeper Corey Blake.

References

 Profile on Hockey Australia

External links

1986 births
Australian male field hockey players
Olympic field hockey players of Australia
Olympic bronze medalists for Australia
Field hockey players at the 2000 Summer Olympics
Field hockey players from Melbourne
Living people
Olympic medalists in field hockey
Medalists at the 2000 Summer Olympics
Commonwealth Games medallists in field hockey
Commonwealth Games gold medallists for Australia
Field hockey players at the 1998 Commonwealth Games
Sportspeople from Melbourne
21st-century Australian people
Medallists at the 1998 Commonwealth Games